Cletus Clark (born January 20, 1962) is a retired male hurdler from the United States, best known for winning the gold medal in the men's 110 metres hurdles at the 1991 Pan American Games.

Achievements

References

1962 births
Living people
American male hurdlers
Athletes (track and field) at the 1987 Pan American Games
Athletes (track and field) at the 1991 Pan American Games
Pan American Games medalists in athletics (track and field)
Pan American Games gold medalists for the United States
Universiade medalists in athletics (track and field)
Universiade gold medalists for the United States
Universiade silver medalists for the United States
Medalists at the 1991 Pan American Games